"Feker Libi" is a song recorded by Israeli singer Eden Alene, performed in English, Amharic, Hebrew and Arabic. It was planned to represent Israel in the Eurovision Song Contest 2020. It would be the first Eurovision entry to contain lyrics in Amharic.

Eurovision Song Contest
The song was released as a single on March 3, 2020. It was set to represent Israel in the Eurovision Song Contest 2020, after Eden Alene was selected through HaKokhav HaBa L'Eurovizion, the music competition that selects Israel's entries for the Eurovision Song Contest. On January 28, 2020, a special allocation draw was held which placed each country into one of the two semi-finals, as well as which half of the show they would perform in. Israel was placed into the first semi-final, to be held on 12 May 2020, and was scheduled to perform in the second half of the show. However, the contest was later cancelled due to the COVID-19 pandemic.

Credits and personnel 
Credits adapted from YouTube.

 Eden Alene – vocals
 Doron Medalie – backing vocals, songwriting
 Idan Raichel – songwriting, production, keyboards
 Yinon Yahel – production, keyboards, programming, mixing, mastering
 Ronen Hilel – recording engineer
 Ofek Ariov – engineer assistant
 Omri Bar Hod – programming
 Rudi Bainesay – backing vocals

Track listing

Charts

See also
Music of Israel

References 

2020 songs
Songs written by Doron Medalie
Eurovision songs of 2020
Eurovision songs of Israel
Dance-pop songs
World music songs
Macaronic songs
Amharic-language songs
Hebrew-language songs
Arabic-language songs
English-language Israeli songs
Eden Alene songs